Subrata Bose (25 February 1932 – 20 January 2016) was an Indian politician, and a member of the 14th Lok Sabha. He represented the Barasat constituency of West Bengal and was a member of the All India Forward Bloc political party.

He graduated in arts from the Scottish Church College at the University of Calcutta in 1952. He died after a cardiac arrest at his residence on 20 January 2016.

External links

 Official biographical sketch in Parliament of India website

2016 deaths
Politicians from Kolkata
1932 births
India MPs 2004–2009
Lok Sabha members from West Bengal
Scottish Church College alumni
University of Calcutta alumni
People from Barasat
All India Forward Bloc politicians
West Bengal MLAs 2001–2006